Giovanni Ansani (11 February 1744 – 15 July 1826) was an Italian tenor and composer.

In 1770, he was singing at Copenhagen. About 1780 he came to London, where he at once took the first place; but, being of a most quarrelsome temper, he threw up his engagement on account of squabbles with soprano castrato Francesco Roncaglia. He returned the next year with his wife, Maccherini, who was not successful. He sang at Florence in 1784, at Rome the autumn of the same year, and elsewhere in Italy; and finally retired to Naples at the age of 50, where he devoted himself to teaching singing.

He was a spirited actor, and had a full, finely-toned, and commanding voice. According to Charles Burney, his voice was one of the sweetest yet most powerful tenors he ever heard; to which, according to Carlo Gervasoni, he added a very rare truth of intonation, great power of expression, and the most perfect method, both of producing the voice and of vocalisation. His wife had as bad a temper as himself, and they were, therefore, a most inharmonious couple. It is said that, when singing together in Italy, if one were more applauded than the other, the unsuccessful one would hire persons to hiss the more fortunate rival.

Ansani was known also as a composer of duets and trios for soprano and bass, with a basso continuo. Ernst Ludwig Gerber reported that an opera of his composition, called La Vendetta di Minos, was performed at Florence in 1791.

Operatic roles to 1780
Massimo in Ezio by Niccolò Jommelli (Bologna, 1768)
Fenicio in Demetrio by Antonio Pampani (Venice, 1768)
Decebalo in Eurione by Ferdinando Bertoni (Udine, 1770)
Demofoonte in Demofoonte by Giuseppe Sarti (Copenhagen, 1771)
Dioneo in Uranio e Erasitea by Giuseppe Colla (Parma, 1773)
Rodoaldo in Ricimero by Luigi Borghi (Venice, 1773)
Tito Vespasiano in La clemenza di Tito by Josef Mysliveček (Venice, 1774)
Danao in Ipermestra by Johann Gottlieb Naumann (Venice, 1774)
Lucio Silla in Lucio Silla by Pasquale Anfossi (Venice, 1774)
Alessandro in Alessandro nell'Indie by Carlo Monza (Milan, 1775)
Medonte in Medonte re di Epiro by Luigi Alessandri (Milan, 1775)
Niso in Aurora by Gaetano Vagnani (Turin, 1775)
Ubaldo in Rinaldo by Antonio Tozzi (Venice, 1775)
Creonte in Antigona' by Ferdinando Bertoni (Alessandria, 1775)
Dario in La disfatta di Dario by Giovanni Paisiello (Rome, 1776)
Lucio Vero in Vologeso by Giovanni Masi (Rome, 1776)
Osroa in Adriano in Siria by Josef Mysliveček (Florence, 1776)
Dario in La disfatta di Dario by Giovanni Paisiello (Florence, 1776)
Dario in La disfatta di Dario by Giovanni Paisiello (Livorno, 1777)
Rodoaldo in Ricimero by Pietro Guglielmi (Naples, 1777)
Dario in La disfatta di Dario by Giovanni Paisiello (Naples, 1777)
Catone in Catone in Utica by Bernardino Ottani (Naples, 1777)
Ariobate in Bellerofonte by Ignazio Platania (Naples, 1778)
Agricano in La Calliroe by Josef Mysliveček (Naples, 1778)
Clistene in L'Olimpiade by Josef Mysliveček (Naples, 1778)
Alessandro in Il re pastore by Ignazio Platania (Naples, 1778)
Agamennone in Ifigenia in Aulide by Vicente Martín y Soler (Naples, 1779)
Agricano in La Calliroe by Josef Mysliveček (Pisa, 1779)
Cajo Mario in Cajo Mario (Pisa, 1779)
Sabino in L'Epponina by Giuseppe Giordani (Florence, 1779)
Timante in Demofoonte by Felice Alessandri (Padua, 1783)
Cajo Mario in Cajo Mario by Domenico Cimarosa (Rome, 1780)
Emirena in Tito nelle Gallie Pasquale Anfossi (Rome, 1780)
Lucio Vero in Vologeso by Giacomo Rust (Rome, 1780)
Antigono in Antigono'' by Josef Mysliveček (Rome, 1780)

Notes

References
 
 

Italian operatic tenors
1744 births
1826 deaths
18th-century Italian male opera singers